Stackhousia subterranea (Gunn's Mignonette or Grasslands Candles) is a perennial herb species in the family Celastraceae. The species occurs in South Australia and Victoria and Tasmania

References

Stackhousia
Flora of South Australia
Flora of Tasmania
Flora of Victoria (Australia)
Taxa named by William Robert Barker